İbrahim Giydirir (born July 25, 1989) is a Turkish Muay Thai kickboxer who competes in the cruiserweight division. Having begun practicing Muay Thai, Giydirir first came to prominence due to a successful amateur career by winning one European as well as taking another medal - a bronze - at the next year IMFA European Championships which he ended after Dzianis Hancharonak and Vladimir Mineev respectively. He also took the bronze at the World Combat Games in 2013. Giydirir signed with SUPERKOMBAT Fighting Championship in 2015 after turning professional and knocking Mike Passenier's student, Fabian Gondorf, out in K-1.

Career
He challenged Artem Vakhitov in a fight for the vacant Battle of Champions (-95 kg/209 lb) Championship at Battle of Champions 7 in Moscow, Russia on November 21, 2014, losing a unanimous decision after five rounds.

Championships and awards

Kickboxing
International Federation of Muaythai Amateur  
2012 IFMA European Muaythai Championships & European Cup Gold Medalist   
2013 IFMA European Muaythai Championships -91 kg/200 Bronze Medalist 
World Combat Games 
2013 World Combat Games -91 kg/200 lb Muay Thai Bronze Medalist

Kickboxing record

|- bgcolor="#fbb"
|2017-10-21|| Loss || align=left|  Bahram Rajabzadeh || Orion Fight Arenadan || Ankara, Turkey || TKO (Low kicks) || 1 || 

|- bgcolor="#fbb"
|2017-07-22 || Loss || align=left|  Bas Vosternbosch || Alkayiş Fight Arena 5 || Mersin, Turkey || Decision (Unanimous) || 3 || 3:00

|-  bgcolor="#CCFFCC"
| 2017-05-13 || Win ||align=left| Adis Dadovic || Akin Dövüş Arenasi Gebze || Gebze, Turkey ||  KO (Head kick) || 1 || 0:39 

|-  bgcolor="#FFBBBB" 
| 2015-05-23 || Loss ||align=left| Bogdan Stoica || SUPERKOMBAT World Grand Prix II 2015, Super Fight || Bucharest, Romania || Decision (unanimous) || 3 || 3:00
|-
|-  bgcolor="#CCFFCC"
| 2015-03-07 || Win ||align=left| Cosmin Ionescu || SUPERKOMBAT World Grand Prix I 2015, Super Fight || Ploiești, Romania ||  Decision (unanimous) || 3 || 3:00 
|-
|-  bgcolor="#FFBBBB"
| 2014-11-21 || Loss ||align=left| Artem Vakhitov || Battle of Champions 7  || Moscow, Russia || Decision (unanimous) || 5 || 3:00
|-
! style=background:white colspan=9 |
|-
|-  bgcolor="#CCFFCC"
| 2014-02-23 || Win ||align=left| Fabian Gondorf || K-1 World MAX 2013 World Championship Tournament Final 4, Super Fight  || Baku, Azerbaijan || KO (left knee) || 3 || 1:45 
|-
|-
| colspan=9 | Legend:

See also 
List of male kickboxers

References

1989 births
Living people
Sportspeople from Istanbul
Turkish male kickboxers
Cruiserweight kickboxers
Heavyweight kickboxers
Turkish Muay Thai practitioners
SUPERKOMBAT kickboxers